Anglican and other Protestant missionaries arrived at Sri Lanka during the early 19th century, when the British took control of Sri Lanka from the Dutch. The oldest Protestant church in Sri Lanka is the Christian Reformed Church in Sri Lanka, formerly the Dutch Reformed Church in Sri Lanka, has over 30 congregations and more than 5,000 members.

In 1842 the Church of Scotland established St. Andrew's Church, Colombo and in 1845 opened a second church in Kandy. These two Scottish church communities forming the Presbytery of Ceylon. The Dutch Reformed Church subsequently joined the Presbytery of Ceylon however in 1952 doctrinal controversies occurred in the Dutch Reformed Church, which led to a split. The dissenting group forming the Presbyterian Church Colombo, with the Presbytery of Ceylon eventually folding. In 1954 the Presbyterian Church Colombo was joined by the Scots Kirk, Kandy to form the Presbytery of Lanka. The St. Andrew's Church, Colombo continues to operate as part of the Church of Scotland, under the jurisdiction of the International Presbytery.The Salvation Army established themselves in Ceylon on 26 January 1883 under the leadership of Captain William Gladwin. He was joined in 1885 by Frederick Booth-Tucker (the son-in-law of William Booth, the Salvation Army's founder). In 1909 the Salvation Army established a territorial headquarters in Colombo. Up until 1920 Ceylon was administered as a sub-territory of South India. In 1921 it was granted full territorial status, with Colonel Millner appointed as its first territorial commander.

The Lanka Lutheran Church was founded in 1978 but went defunct in the mid-2000s. It was replaced in 2017 by the Ceylon Evangelical Lutheran Church (CELC). The CELC has fifteen congregations and about 1,200 members.

About 160,518 persons (0.8% of the population) are Protestants. The annual growth of Protestants in Sri Lanka is about 3.9%.

Violence for religious reasons against Christians occurs. 43 percent of the Protestants in the early 1980s were Sinhalese.

See also 
 Christianity in Sri Lanka
 American Ceylon Mission
 Sri Lanka Baptist Sangamaya
 Lanka Lutheran Church
 Methodist Church in Sri Lanka
 Believers Eastern Church
 Church of Ceylon
 Ceylon Pentecostal Mission
 Jaffna Diocese, Church of South India

References 

 
Sri Lanka
History of the Dutch East India Company